F750 may refer to:

Formula 750, International motorcycle road racing series known as F750
750 Formula, British historic single seat open car racing
750 Motor Club Organisers of 750 Formula car racing
Ford F-Series (medium duty truck)